Dimitar Petrov Khlebarov (3 September 1934 – 28 October 2009) was pole vaulter from Bulgaria. He set his personal best (4.96 metres) on 26 September 1965 at a meet in Sofia. He was born in Yambol.

Achievements

References

trackfield.brinkster
Dimitar Khlebarov's obituary 

1934 births
2009 deaths
Bulgarian male pole vaulters
Athletes (track and field) at the 1960 Summer Olympics
Athletes (track and field) at the 1964 Summer Olympics
Olympic athletes of Bulgaria
Universiade medalists in athletics (track and field)
People from Yambol
Universiade gold medalists for Bulgaria
Medalists at the 1961 Summer Universiade
21st-century Bulgarian people
20th-century Bulgarian people